is a Japanese comedy manga series written and illustrated by Yoshio Sawai. It was serialized in Shueisha's shōnen manga magazine Weekly Shōnen Jump from February 2001 to November 2005, with its chapters collected in twenty-one tankōbon volumes. It was followed by a sequel titled Shinsetsu Bobobo-bo Bo-bobo, serialized from December 2005 to July 2007, with its chapters collected in seven tankōbon volumes. A seventy-six episode anime television series adaptation by Toei Animation was broadcast on TV Asahi from November 2003 to October 2005. In North America, Viz Media published some volumes of the manga. The anime series aired in the United States on Cartoon Network from 2005 to 2007. As of January 2021, the Bobobo-bo Bo-bobo manga had over 7 million copies in circulation.

Plot

In the year 300X, the entire world is under the tyrannical rule of a regime called the Maruhage Empire (Chrome Dome Empire in the English dub). Its ruler, Emperor Tsuru Tsurulina IV (Czar Baldy Bald IV), has initiated the Hair Hunt, a crusade where his soldiers, the Hair Hunters, invade settlements, shave bald every person they see, and leave said settlements in ruins. Standing against the Hair Hunt is Bobobo-bo Bo-bobo, a bizarre rebel who fights the Hair Hunters with the Hanage Shinken (Fist of the Nose Hair), a martial art that gives him the power to control his nose hairs like whips. Bo-bobo's team consists of Beauty, a normal teenage girl he rescued; Heppokomaru (Gasser), a teenage boy who fights with the Onara Shinken (Fist of the Back Wind), allowing him to weaponize his own flatulence; and Don Patch (Poppa Rocks), an eccentric creature who leads the Hajike Gang (Wiggin Gang), a group that fights by confusing their enemies into submission. Bo-bobo is on an exciting, gag-filled quest in which he uses his hair as a weapon in many locales to fight the forces of the Maruhage Empire as he gains other allies along the way.

Media

Manga

Bobobo-bo Bo-bobo, written and illustrated by Yoshio Sawai, was serialized in Shueisha's  shōnen manga magazine Weekly Shōnen Jump from February 20, 2001, to November 14, 2005. Shueisha collected its 230 individual chapters into twenty-one tankōbon volumes, released from July 4, 2001, to May 2, 2006.

A sequel manga titled  was published in Weekly Shōnen Jump from December 19, 2005, to July 2, 2007. Shueisha compiled the sequel's 73 individual chapters into seven tankōbon volumes released from July 4, 2006, to January 1, 2008.

In North America, the manga has been licensed by Viz Media and was published in a one-shot graphic novel form on October 5, 2005, including content from the 9th and 10th volumes of the Japanese release. It was later published monthly in Shonen Jump from July 2007 to June 2009. At Anime Expo 2008, when asked about why the previous volumes were never published, Viz said it was due to the "content". Viz restarted the manga release in 2008. The first volume (11th volume of the Japanese release) was published on August 5, 2008. A total of five volumes of Bobobo-bo Bo-bobo were published until October 5, 2010, before Viz Media ceased the series' publication.

Anime

The anime adaptation of Bobobo-bo Bo-bobo is directed by Hiroki Shibata, produced by Toei Animation and ran for 76 episodes from November 8, 2003, to October 29, 2005, on TV Asahi.

In North America, the anime was licensed by the Joy Tashjian Marketing Group, a licensing representative named by Toei Animation. The series first aired as a sneak peek on Cartoon Network's "Summer 2005 Kick-Off Special" in May 2005, and then premiered on September 30 and aired on Cartoon Network's Toonami programming block Saturdays at 10/9c, starting on October 1. New episodes premiered on February 17, 2007. The series was seen on Cartoon Network's broadband service Toonami Jetstream from November 5, 2007, until its closure in January 2009. In the United Kingdom, the series premiered on Jetix on April 16, 2007.

The series was originally licensed for home video release in North America by Illumitoon Entertainment in 2006, who released only 2 volumes on bilingual DVD in 2007, before their distribution deal with Westlake Entertainment fell through, and all further volumes were canceled. S'more Entertainment later announced on January 16, 2012, that they would release the series with English subtitles and dubbing on DVD on April 10 of the same year. This release, however, lacked an English subtitle track, despite a fully translated script being present on a PDF file on disc 4 and indication on the box and pre-release information that there would be a subtitle track on the release. S'more Entertainment released a statement claiming the packaging was wrong, and there never was an intention to subtitle the release, due to costs. In August 2018, Discotek Media announced the licensee of the series and was released on January 28, 2020, as a SD Blu-ray Disc set with all the 76 episodes.

Video games
There are seven Japan-exclusive video games based on Bobobo-bo Bo-bobo developed by Hudson Soft. Four video games were launched for the Game Boy Advance, two video games for the PlayStation 2 and one for the GameCube. Characters from the series have appeared along with characters from other Weekly Shōnen Jump'''s series in the crossover fighting games Jump Superstars and Jump Ultimate Stars for the Nintendo DS, and J-Stars Victory VS for the PlayStation 3 and PlayStation Vita.

Reception
As of January 2021, the Bobobo-bo Bo-bobo'' manga had over 7 million copies in circulation.

References

Further reading

External links

 

Bobobo-bo Bo-bobo
2001 manga
2003 anime television series debuts
2005 manga
Adventure anime and manga
Discotek Media
Parody anime and manga
Shōnen manga
Shueisha franchises
Shueisha manga
Surreal comedy anime and manga
Toei Animation television
Toonami
TV Asahi original programming
Viz Media manga